The 2004 UCLA Bruins football team represented the University of California, Los Angeles in the 2004 NCAA Division I-A football season.  They played their home games at the Rose Bowl in Pasadena, California and were coached by Karl Dorrell. It was Dorrell's second season as the UCLA head coach.  UCLA was not ranked in the preseason polls.  The Bruins finished 6–6 overall, and were tied for fifth place in the Pacific-10 Conference with a 4–4 record.  The Bruins were invited to play in the Las Vegas Bowl vs. Wyoming on December 30, 2004.

Key players

Schedule

Game summaries

Oklahoma State

Sources:

Illinois

Washington

San Diego State

Arizona

California

Arizona State

Stanford

Washington State

Oregon

USC

Wyoming (Las Vegas Bowl)

Sources:

References

UCLA
UCLA Bruins football seasons
UCLA Bruins football